Kristine Alexie Besas-Tutor, also known in Bohol as Lexie (born January 24, 1981), is a Filipino businesswoman and politician. She is a member of the House of Representatives, representing the Third District of Bohol.

Education
Kristine Alexie completed both her basic education in 1993  and secondary education in 1997 at the Holy Spirit School of Tagbilaran. In 2002, she finished her tertiary education and graduated BS Physical Therapy at Velez College in Cebu City.
Currently, she is a licensed physical therapist by profession and a law graduate.

Political career
Tutor's first stint in politics was during the 2013 Bohol local elections when she ran for vice-mayor of Guindulman. Her opponent, which is the incumbent vice-mayor on that time won the seat by a slim margin. Eventually, Tutor became the first lady of Candijay when her husband, Christopher Tutor was elected  as chief executive of the town.

Board Member, Bohol's 3rd District
During the 2016 Bohol local elections, Tutor ran and was elected as a member of Sangguniang Panlalawigan of Bohol's 3rd District earning the highest number of votes among the aspirants.

Provincial Board Committee membership
The young legislator held the following membership at the provincial board:
Chairperson, Committee on Tourism
Chairperson, Committee on Women and Family Welfare
Vice-Chairperson, Committee on Trade and Industry
Vice-Chairperson, Committee on Zoning and Rural Development
Member, Committee on Health and Public Sanitation 
Member, Committee on Labor and Employment

Representative, Bohol's 3rd District
On May 14, 2019, Tutor won and elected as the new representative of the province's 3rd District during the 2019 Bohol local elections besting seasoned politicians namely, vice-governor Dionisio Balite, Carmen mayor Conchita Toribio-delos Reyes, and retired judge Carlos Fernando. She also became the first congresswoman from Bohol's 3rd District and second congresswoman from Bohol after Venice Borja-Agana.

The young lawmaker, together with her mayor husband, is known for their Pabahay Program which provides low-cost housing to indigent families of the district.

On November 6, 2020, Tutor launched the patient transport vehicle (PTV) service for the all residents of the 3rd district which made possible through various donations under Oplan Tabang program, providing free transportation services to indigent patients,  PWD, and senior citizens access to medical facilities within the province.

On May 11, 2022, Tutor was reelected for second term as representative of the district.

House Committee membership
Vice-chairperson, Health
Member of the Majority, Appropriations
Member of the Majority, Basic Education and Culture
Member of the Majority, Foreign Affairs
Member of the Majority, Higher and Technical Education
Member of the Majority, Housing and Urban Development
Member of the Majority, Overseas Workers Affairs
Member of the Majority, Visayas Development
Member of the Majority, Welfare of Children
Member of the Majority, Women and Gender Equality
Member of the Majority, Youth and Sports Development

Passed bills

Principal authored bills
HB04228 - enacted as Republic Act 11465 - General Appropriations Act of 2020, 2020-01-06
HB05477 - enacted as Republic Act 11463 - Malasakit Centers Act of 2019, 2019-12-03
HB05712 - enacted as Republic Act 11466 - Salary Standardization Law of 2019, 2020-01-08
HB06895 - enacted as Republic Act 11480 - An Act Amending Section 3 of Republic Act No. 7797, Otherwise Known as "An Act to Lengthen The School Calendar From 200 days to not more than 220 Class Days" of 2020, 2020-07-17
HB06953 - enacted as Republic Act 11494 - Bayanihan to Recover as One Act of 2020, 2020-09-11

Co-Authored Bills
HB00219 (Consolidated into HB05712) -  enacted as Republic Act 11466 - Salary Standardization Law of 2019, 2020-01-08

References

People from Bohol
Living people
Members of the House of Representatives of the Philippines from Bohol
Nationalist People's Coalition politicians
1981 births